Jana Herzen (born April 24, 1959 in San Francisco), is a singer-songwriter with folk, world, rock and jazz influences who founded Motéma Music, a Harlem-based record label focused on virtuosic jazz and world music. Prior to founding the label in 2003, she worked as a musician (her CD, Soup's on Fire, was the first CD on the label) and as an art agent for Winston Smith, who designed the logo for Motéma.  Herzen was instrumental in the publishing of Artcrime, Smith's 2nd volume of collected works on the Last Gasp publishing imprint.

Biography
Her parents were university professors Leonard Herzenberg and Leonore Herzenberg, and she was raised on the campus of Stanford University.  She attended Stanford from 1977 to 1979, and New York University (NYU) from 1980 to 1982, where she completed an undergraduate degree in drama. While at NYU, she met Bernard Telsey and Robert LuPone, and together with five other NYU graduates, they founded the theatre production group Manhattan Class Company, for which she served as a dramaturg, script doctor, lighting designer, actor, and director for 10 years.  In 1991, she left Manhattan to travel to Japan, Bali, and Australia where she worked on songs for her first album, which was eventually recorded in San Francisco and Paris from 1994 to 1997, and produced by Congolese worldbeat bassist and producer Shaka Ra Mutela.

Herzen was A and R director and president of Motéma, a label founded in San Francisco.  The label released two to three albums in a year, to an internationally distributed imprint with over 80 releases by 40 artists including albums by Gregory Porter, Randy Weston, Geri Allen, and Monty Alexander.

Discography

As leader
 Soup's on Fire (Motéma, 2003)
 Passion of a Lonely Heart (Motéma, 2012)
 Nothing But Love (Motéma, 2020)

As a co-leader
Nett Duo: Charnett Moffett, Jana Herzen – Overtones (Motéma, 2018)
Jana Herzen and Charnett Moffett – Round The World (Motéma, 2020)

as side artist
Babatunde Lea —Soul Pools (Motéma, 2003)
DJ Jackie Christie – Made 4 U (Motéma, 2004)
Patrick Stanfield Jones – A Heart and an Open Road (Motéma, 2010)
Charnett Moffett – Treasure (Motéma, 2010)

as producer
Babatunde Lea —Soul Pools (Motéma. 2003)
Amy London – Let's Fly (Motéma, 2011)
Monty Alexander – Harlem – Kingston Express Live! MTM-67 (Motéma, 2011)

as executive producer
Babatunde Lea – Level of Intent 8-20320-0047-2 (Diaspora Records, 1996)
Babatunde Lea – Soul Pools 7-09363-7136-2 (Motéma, 2003)
Lynne Arriale Trio – Arise MTM71372 (Motéma, 2003)
DJ Jackie Christie/Discomind – "Beautiful Day" [single] (2003)
DJ Jackie Christie – Made 4 U RAD 90079-2 (Motéma, 2004)
Babatunde Lea – Suite Unseen:  Summoner of the Ghost MTM 00002 (Motéma, 2004)
Marc Cary – Focus MTM-00005 (Motéma, 2006)
Amy London – When I Look into Your Eyes MTM-00011 (Motéma, 2007)
Rufus Reid Quintet – Live at the Kennedy Center MTM-00009 (CD+DVD) (Motéma, 2007)
Roni Ben-Hur – Keepin' It Open 232537 (Motéma, 2007)
Pete Levin – Deacon Blues MTM-0008 (Motéma, 2007)
Roni Ben-Hur, Gene Bertoncini – Smile:  Jazz Therapy, Volume 1 MTM – 00018 (Motéma, 2008)
The New Jazz Composers Octet – The Turning Gate MTM-00019 (Motéma, 2008)
K.J. Denhert – Dal Vivo a Umbria Jazz MTM – 00017 (Motéma, 2008)
Antonio Ciacca Quintet – Rush Life 232536 (Motéma, 2008)
Alexis Cole – The Greatest Gift MTM-26 (Motéma, 2009)
Babatunde Lea's Umbo Weti:  A Tribute to Leon Thomas MTM-25 (Motéma, 2009)
Tessa Souter – Obsession MTM-27 (Motéma, 2009)
Lynne Arriale – Nuance:  The Bennett Studio Sessions MTM-00022 (Motéma, 2009)
Charnett Moffett – The Art of Improvisation MTM-21 (Motéma, 2009)
Randy Weston – The Storyteller MTM-51 (Motéma, 2010)
Geri Allen and Timeline – Live MTM-42 (Motéma, 2010)
Patrick Stanfield Jones – A Heart and an Open Road MTM-39 (Motéma, 2010)
Charnett Moffett – Treasure MTM-43 (Motéma, 2010)
Rufus Reid featuring Steve Allee & Duduka da Fonseca – Out Front MTM-36 (Motéma, 2010)
Geri Allen – Flying Toward the Sound MTM-37 (Motéma, 2010)
Tomoko Sugawara – Along the Silk Road MTM-31 (Motéma, 2010)
Antonio Ciacca Quintet – Lagos Blues MTM-32 (Motéma, 2010)
Monty Alexander – Harlem – Kingston Express Live! MTM-67 (Motéma, 2011)
Jean-Michel Pilc – Essential MTM-61 (Motéma, 2011)
Nilson Matta and Roni Ben-Hur with Victor Lewis and Café – Mojave – Jazz Therapy, Vol. 3 MTM-64 (Motéma, 2011)
Pilc Moutin Hoenig – ‘’Threedom’’ MTM-72 (Motéma, 2011)

References

External links
Official site

Living people
American women singer-songwriters
American women jazz singers
American jazz singers
Motéma Music artists
21st-century American women
1959 births